Sergei Yevgenyevich Shcheglov (born 26 November 1976) is a Ukrainian professional football player. Currently, he plays for FC Avangard Kursk. He also holds Russian citizenship.

Honours
 Russian Cup finalist: 2005 (played in the early stages of the 2004–05 tournament for FC Khimki).

External links
 Career summary at KLISF

1976 births
Living people
Ukrainian footballers
Ukrainian expatriate footballers
Expatriate footballers in Finland
Expatriate footballers in Azerbaijan
FC Khimki players
FC Kryvbas Kryvyi Rih players
Simurq PIK players
Association football midfielders
Jakobstads BK players
FC Avangard Kursk players
FC Chita players